Lime Lake is a lake in the U.S. state of Washington.

Lime Lake was named for the lime sediment it contains.

See also
List of lakes in Washington

References

Bodies of water of Pend Oreille County, Washington
Lakes of Washington (state)